Hapoel Kiryat Shmona was an Israeli football club based in Kiryat Shmona. The club played at the Ironi Stadium, and ceased to exist in 2000 when it merged with Maccabi Kiryat Shmona to form Hapoel Ironi Kiryat Shmona.

History
The club played in Liga Artzit (then the second division) in the early 1980s, but were relegated to Liga Alef in 1985. They returned to Liga Artzit in the mid-1990s, but were relegated back to Liga Alef at the end of the 1996–97 season.

Due to league restructuring, at the end of the 1998–99 season Liga Alef became the fourth tier. At the end of the 1999–2000 season the club was merged with Maccabi Kiryat Shmona to form Hapoel Ironi Kiryat Shmona at the initiative of businessman Izzy Sheratzky.

Honours

League

Other

References

Kiryat Shmona
Kiryat Shmona
Association football clubs disestablished in 2000
Hapoel Ironi Kiryat Shmona F.C.
1953 establishments in Israel
2000 disestablishments in Israel